Hell on Heels: The Battle of Mary Kay is a 2002 American-Canadian made-for-television biographical comedy-drama film directed by Ed Gernon and starring Shirley MacLaine and Shannen Doherty.

Plot
Biopicture about Mary Kay Ash, cosmetics queen and business woman. She tells her story of her rise to fame to the inquiring reporter Annika Kern. Her powerful position is threatened by the much younger Jinger Heath. Her BeautiControl company takes an enormous bite in Mary Kay's company. In the middle of their rivalry enters Lexi Wilcox, a slightly off-center beauty.

Cast
 Shirley MacLaine - Mary Kay Ash
 Shannen Doherty - Lexi Wilcox
 Parker Posey - Jinger Heath
 R.H. Thomson - Richard Rogers
 Barry Flatman - Dick Heath
 Rachel Crawford - Annika Kern
 Dean McKenzie - Clifton Sanders
 Marnie McPhail - Brooker

References

External links

2002 television films
2002 films
2000s biographical films
2002 comedy-drama films
American biographical films
American comedy-drama films
Canadian biographical films
Canadian comedy-drama films
English-language Canadian films
CBS network films
Lifetime (TV network) films
Films with screenplays by Patricia Resnick
American drama television films
2000s American films
2000s Canadian films